Michael Howard DelGiorno (born August 30, 1964) is a talk radio host on WWTN in Nashville, Tennessee.  He is the son of noted New Orleans, Louisiana radio personality Bob DelGiorno.  DelGiorno is married to Andrea, and father of Anna, Alex, and Nick DelGiorno.

DelGiornio is a local talk radio host currently with 99.7 WWTN-FM in Nashville, Tennessee and who was previously on KFAQ in Tulsa, Oklahoma from 2002-2007.   In 2002 he helped to establish KFAQ as a talk radio station, switching from its previous format as a country music station known as KVOO. His co-host Gwen Freeman succeeded him after his departure in April, 2007, but shortly afterward (February 2008) also left KFAQ, initially joining him as co-host of his Nashville program.

Prior to the launch of KFAQ, DelGiorno was the operations manager of Clear Channel Radio Tulsa and host of the morning show on KTBZ "The BUZZ" AM 1430.  Previous to that DelGiorno was program director and afternoon host on NewsTalk 740 KRMG. In his decade at KRMG, DelGiorno was twice voted "Oklahoma Radio Personality of Year" by the Oklahoma Association of Broadcasters.  DelGiornio's show featured in-depth investigations of local and state politicians, notably Tulsa Mayor Kathy Taylor and Oklahoma Governor Brad Henry.

DelGiorno is a born-again Christian and Republican who is also a friend to several prominent Tulsa Democrats.

In 2004, DelGiorno published a memoir entitled Standing Up for What's Right in which he described circumstances involved in his move from KRMG to KFAQ, other moves which he had made earlier in his radio career, his political and religious philosophies and the influences shaping them, and personal details about his life such as his being born with a clubfoot and the career crisis which led him to personal bankruptcy.

DelGiorno and co-host Freeman were credited for helping to overturn a Tulsa City Council election for voter irregularities.  The loser in that election was Roscoe Turner, a prominent Democrat. After a legal challenge, the election was invalidated and Turner was the winner of the new election.

DelGiorno also saw controversy while in Tulsa.  An outspoken critic of gambling and Indian casinos, DelGiorno was banned from two separate Indian casinos based upon allegations of inappropriate conduct.  DelGiorno admitted on the air that he had been gambling, but never admitted to the allegations of misconduct DelGiorno was also sued for defamation by Tulsa City Councilor Bill Christiansen over remarks DelGiorno made on the air about Christiansen's business practices.  The suit was settled prior to trial.  Terms of the settlement were confidential, but DelGiorno's former radio station was required to run a retraction and apologize for DelGiorno's remarks, which the station admitted were not true.

Later, Tulsa City Councilors Chris Medlock and Jim Mautino were the subjects of a recall effort mounted from outside the City of Tulsa.  KFAQ took up the challenge, and are credited with helping these City Councilors to survive the recall effort.

DelGiorno left KFAQ in Tulsa for WWTN, a higher-rated talk station in the Nashville, Tennessee market, in April 2007.

References

American talk radio hosts
1964 births
Living people
Radio personalities from Oklahoma